Luther Wright Mott (November 30, 1874 – July 10, 1923) was a United States Representative from New York.

Born in Oswego, he attended the public schools and graduated from Harvard University in 1896.

Mott began his career at the First National Bank of Oswego, which was owned by his family, and he eventually became the bank's cashier and vice president.  He was a founder of the Oswego Chamber of Commerce, created by merging two other organizations, and he served as its president.

A civic activist, Mott was a trustee of the Presbyterian church he attended, the public library in Oswego, and Oswego's Home for the Homeless and Orphan Asylum.

In 1907 Mott was appointed state Banking Commissioner, but served just five days before resigning on the grounds of ill health.

He was a delegate to the 1908 Republican National Convention and he was president of the New York State Bankers' Association from 1910 until 1911.

Mott was elected as a Republican to the Sixty-Second and to the six succeeding Congresses and served from March 4, 1911 until his death in Oswego in 1923.  During his service in Congress Mott advocated women's suffrage and prohibition.

During World War I Mott organized of the 9th Division of the New York Naval Militia in Oswego.  He also aided in the organization of a division in Fulton.

Mott died in Oswego on July 10, 1923.  He was buried at Riverside Cemetery in Oswego.

Family
In 1902 Mott married Ruth Woolsey Johnson of Oswego.  They had three children: Luther W., Jr.; Alice Wright; and Dorothy J.

After Mott's death his widow was appointed as Oswego's postmaster.

See also
List of United States Congress members who died in office (1900–49)

References

Luther W. Mott, at The North Country: A History, Embracing Jefferson, St. Lawrence, Oswego, Lewis and Franklin Counties, New York.  1932.  Harry F. Landon, author.  Historical Publishing Company, Indianapolis, publisher.

Letter from Mott to Teddy Roosevelt (pt.1)
Letter from Mott to Teddy Roosevelt (pt.2)

1874 births
1923 deaths
Politicians from Oswego, New York
Harvard University alumni
American bankers
Republican Party members of the United States House of Representatives from New York (state)
Burials in New York (state)